The Fogo Island Opening Tournament (Portuguese: Torneio de Abertura do Fogo, Capeverdean Crioulo, ALUPEC or ALUPEK: Turnéu di Abertura du Fogo), is an opening tournament competition (equivalent to a league cup) played during the season in the island of Fogo, Cape Verde  The competition is organized by the Fogo Regional Football Association.  The winner with the most points (sometimes in the final) is the winner.

The first edition took place in 2001 and Botafogo was the first winner, Cutelinho was the second winner won in 2002. Since 2006, no competitions of the opening tournament/association cup has taken place.

Winners

See also
Sport in Fogo, Cape Verde
Fogo Premier Division
Fogo Island Cup
Fogo Island Super Cup
Fogo Champion's Cup

References

Sport in Fogo, Cape Verde
Football cup competitions in Cape Verde
2000 establishments in Cape Verde